Harry William "Whanny" Whanslaw (1883–1965) was a British author, illustrator and puppeteer who was best known for prompting the revival of puppetry in the United Kingdom in the 1920s.

Life and career
Harry Whanslaw was born in 1883, in Putney, London. In 1923, he published his book Everybody's Theatre, which lead to the founding of The British Model Theatre Guild, which would later be renamed the British Puppet and Model Theatre Guild of which he was president. He with fellow puppeteer Waldo Lancaster also founded the London Marionette Theatre in 1926. In 1935, Whanslaw set up another puppet theatre, the Studio Marionette Theatre, in his house in London, where he put on regular performances along with students and friends. During World War II, he worked with young people and the homeless, creating puppets from bomb-damaged buildings.

References

1883 births
1965 deaths
British puppeteers
British writers
British illustrators
People from Putney